State Road 96 (NM 96) is a  state highway in Sandoval and Rio Arriba counties in  New Mexico, United States, that connects U.S. Route 550 (US 550) northwest of Cuba with U.S. Route 84 (US 84) east of Abiquiu Reservoir.

Route description

History

Major intersections

See also

 List of state roads in New Mexico

References

External links

096
Transportation in Sandoval County, New Mexico
Transportation in Rio Arriba County, New Mexico